Grant Steven Wilson (born July 3, 1974) is an art director and developer for Rather Dashing Games (now a division of Kalmbach Publishing), a game company he founded with Michael Richie, and is the co-founder of The Atlantic Paranormal Society (TAPS), which is based in Warwick, Rhode Island. He is also the star and co-producer of the cable television reality series Ghost Hunters. He left the show in 2014 and returned for the 2019 revival.

Personal life 
Wilson and his wife Reanna have three sons. After an early career in web design, Wilson became a plumber and worked for Roto-Rooter, a large plumbing service company based in Cincinnati, Ohio. His hobbies include writing and illustrating fantasy and role-playing game characters as well as playing and composing music on various instruments including guitar and piano. He is an avid Star Wars fan.

Wilson is a member of the Church of Jesus Christ of Latter-day Saints. Wilson served an LDS Mission in Italy.

Career 
Wilson first met TAPS co-founder, Jason Hawes, after offering to redesign the website of the Rhode Island Paranormal Society (RIPS), a support group Hawes had formed for people who had paranormal experiences. Wilson subsequently admitted that the real reason he wanted to meet Hawes was that he had undergone an intense, recurring paranormal experience beginning at the age of fifteen. Hawes and Wilson went on to found TAPS together. According to his own account, Wilson's recurring experience involved seeing an unidentified entity in the Rhode Island woods on a regular basis.

Wilson and Hawes are longtime co-workers as plumbers for Roto-Rooter. It was Hawes who brought Wilson into the plumbing business. The two are former co-owners of the Spalding Inn, based in Whitefield, New Hampshire. Wilson, Hawes, and other members of the paranormal community frequently give lectures at schools and paranormal-related conventions. Wilson is also available for hire for private ghost hunting trips, and along with Hawes has used public ghost hunting events and personal appearances to raise money for various charities such as Cure Kids Cancer and Shriners Hospitals for Children.

Hawes and Wilson also participate in ghost hunting events created specifically for the paying public. More recently TAPS has offered an event solely hosted by the TAPS members. The personal ghost hunting events have gained more and more popularity over the years with television celebrity guests. TAPS co-hosts events locations such as the Stanley Hotel in Colorado, RMS Queen Mary ocean liner in California, and the Buffalo Central Terminal in Buffalo, New York.

On the 13th mid-season opener for South Park, Grant and Jason were both parodied and portrayed as easily frightened, going as far as to wet and poop their pants. However, neither the real-life Wilson or Jason Hawes were offended, and Grant made a post on Twitter.

On the February 15, 2012, edition of Ghost Hunters, Wilson announced that he would be leaving the Ghost Hunters show for personal reasons, including working on his own projects. The May 16, 2012, episode of Ghost Hunters was Wilson's last episode. He is now the vice president of Rather Dashing Games.

In the 10th season of Ghost Hunters, which premiered on October 8, 2014, Wilson returned to the show for the two-hour 200th episode, which was aired on October 22, 2014.

In a 2013 interview on British radio, Wilson described some of the scariest cases he had to deal with on Ghost Hunters, including being held by a whole town that practiced black magic. He also discussed life after Ghost Hunters, including his band Carpetshark and his forthcoming high-fantasy novels.

In 2019 Grant returned to Ghost Hunters on A&E for two seasons.

Bibliography

See also 
 Ghost hunting
 List of reportedly haunted locations
 Paranormal television

References

External links 

 

1974 births
Living people
American plumbers
Paranormal investigators
Participants in American reality television series
People from Warwick, Rhode Island
Ghost Hunters (TV series)
21st-century American novelists
American male novelists
21st-century American male writers
American Latter Day Saints
American Mormon missionaries in Italy